"Could've Been" is a song by American teen-pop singer Tiffany, released as the third single from her debut album, Tiffany (1987). Commercially, the song proved to be a successful follow-up to her debut single "I Think We're Alone Now", peaking atop the US Billboard Hot 100, the Canadian RPM Top Singles chart, and the Irish Singles Chart in early 1988. It also reached number four on the UK Singles Chart and number five in New Zealand.

Background and release
Music industry insider Don McGovern first heard the song when he walked into a Hungry Tiger Restaurant in Thousand Oaks, California and heard a local performer, Lois Blaisch, singing the song. McGovern introduced it to producer George Tobin.

The song is a slow ballad about love that could have been better. Both Tiffany's label, MCA Records, and her manager, George Tobin, were concerned that she was not old or mature enough to handle a song with such emotional depth. However, Tiffany convinced them that she could, and the song was recorded and included on her self-titled debut album, becoming its third single.

Chart performance
After debuting at number 86 on the US Billboard Hot 100 in November 1987, "Could've Been" quickly rose up the chart and spent two weeks at number one in February, becoming Tiffany's second consecutive number-one hit following "I Think We're Alone Now". The song was also a number-one hit on the Billboard Adult Contemporary chart, as well as in Ireland and Canada. The song reached the top 10 in Australia, New Zealand, Sweden, and the United Kingdom and also charted well in Belgium, the Netherlands, and South Africa.

Critical reception
John Aizlewood from Number One declared the song as "mighty", noting how "she croons and how she moves the emotions like a large cheque."

Music video
For the music video, music video stations played a live version of "Could've Been" where fans sang along to Tiffany's performance.

Track listing
 7-inch single and cassette single
Could've Been – 4:00
The Heart of Love – 3:57

Charts

Weekly charts

Year-end charts

Sales and certifications

Cover versions
Lois Blaisch finally released her own version in 1997 when she included it on her album Through Thick and Thin.
Country singer Carrie Underwood covered the song on American Idol.
The song was recorded by a Filipina artist named Sarah Geronimo.
Tiffany herself re-recorded the song for the 2007 compilation I Think We're Alone Now: 80's Hits and More, backed only by a piano and keyboards.

In popular culture
The song was heard in the television series Growing Pains, on the episode "Nasty Habits".

See also
 List of Billboard  Hot 100 number-one singles of 1988
 List of Billboard  number-one Adult Contemporary singles of 1988
 List of RPM Top Singles number-one singles of 1988
 List of Irish Singles Chart number-one singles of 1988

References

1980s ballads
1987 songs
1988 singles
Billboard Hot 100 number-one singles
Cashbox number-one singles
Irish Singles Chart number-one singles
MCA Records singles
Pop ballads
RPM Top Singles number-one singles
Tiffany Darwish songs